Aloe bakeri is a species of flowering plant in the family Asphodelaceae, native to Madagascar, where it grows on rocky hills at low elevations. The leaves are typically 10 cm (4 in) long and bear straight or slightly curved white teeth that are 1 mm long and about 1-2 mm apart. In summer it produces red or orange, green-tipped tubular flowers. These flowers are attractive to birds, bees, and wasps, and are typically 2 cm (0.75 in) long, borne on racemes 30 cm (12 in) tall.

The Latin specific epithet bakeri honours one of two British horticulturalists, in this case John Gilbert Baker of Kew (1834-1920).

It has gained the Royal Horticultural Society's Award of Garden Merit. However, it may be susceptible to scale and mealybugs. In the US, this plant is best grown outside only in hardiness zone 11.

References

bakeri
Perennial plants
Plants described in 1891